Vestlandsnytt (The Western Norway Gazette) is a local Norwegian newspaper published in Fosnavåg in Møre og Romsdal county.

The paper is published in Nynorsk and is edited by Endre Vorren. It is issued twice a week, on Tuesdays and Fridays. Its primary coverage area is the municipalities of Herøy and Sande. The newspaper was launched in 1935 by Olav Aurvoll. After Aurvoll, the paper's ownership and operations were taken over by Frantz Frantzen. Today his son, Fred Frantzen Jr., is the paper's owner and manager. Vestlandsnytt has its main office in Fosnavåg and a branch office in Larsnes.

Circulation
According to the Norwegian Audit Bureau of Circulations and National Association of Local Newspapers, Vestlandsnytt has had the following annual circulation:
 2006: 5,357 
 2007: 5,393
 2008: 5,406
 2009: 5,320
 2010: 5,228
 2011: 5,120
 2012: 5,040
 2013: 4,884
 2014: 4,767
 2015: 4,652
 2016: 4,320

References

Further reading
Rabben, Bjarne. 1995. Vestlandsnytt – bodberar i 60 år. Fosnavåg: Vestlandsnytt

Newspapers published in Norway
Norwegian-language newspapers
Herøy, Møre og Romsdal
Mass media in Møre og Romsdal
Publications established in 1935
1935 establishments in Norway
Nynorsk